Street Girl is a 1929 pre-Code musical film directed by Wesley Ruggles and starring Betty Compson, John Harron and Jack Oakie. It was adapted by Jane Murfin from "The Viennese Charmer", a short story by William Carey Wonderly. While it was the first film made by RKO Radio Pictures, its opening was delayed until after Syncopation, making it RKO's second release. It was very successful at the box office, accounting for almost half of RKO's profits for the entire year.

Plot
The Four Seasons are a very good jazz quartet, but they perform in a New York City cafe for only $100 a week, forcing them to share a small, rundown apartment.  The quartet consists of Joe Spring on clarinet, Pete Summer on accordion and guitar, Mike Fall on piano and trumpet, and an ever-pessimistic Happy Winter on violin.

On his way home one night, Mike drives off a man accosting a young blonde named Frederika Joyzelle.  When she tells him she has not eaten in two days, he persuades her to share the group's dinner. She tells them that back in her homeland, she was a violinist. The highlight of her career given a command performance for her homeland's ruler, Prince Nicholaus of Aregon.  Mike convinces his bandmates to allow "Freddie" to room with them for two weeks, after they discover she has no place to go.  Freddie talks the band into asking for a raise to $200, but when they are turned down, they impulsively quit. Mike is further discouraged when they return to the apartment to find Freddie gone.

However, Freddie soon returns with great news. She has spent all day trying to convince Keppel, the owner of the well-known Little Aregon Cafe, to give the quartet a tryout. She finally succeeded, and at a salary of $300 a week. She gets a job there too, as a cigarette girl and part-time violinist. As time goes on, Mike falls in love with Freddie, but is unsure how she feels about him.

Prince Nicholaus of Aregon is in town, trying to arrange financing for his country. He and his entourage go to the cafe, much to Keppel's delight. When Freddie performs for him, he remembers her and kisses her on the forehead.  The newspaper coverage of the kiss causes the cafe to skyrocket in popularity overnight. When a competitor of Keppel's asks the group to perform at his establishment, Keppel wins a bidding war by raising their wages to $3000 a week. This enables them to move into a much fancier apartment. However, the kiss also causes Mike to become jealous to the point of quitting the band.

The popularity of Keppel's cafe allows him to move into the larger "Club Joyzelle". With the help of Prince Nicholaus, Freddie and Mike are reunited in time for the grand opening.  Even Happy, who is anything but, smiles as a result.

Cast

 Betty Compson as Frederika "Freddy" Joyzelle
 John Harron as Mike Fall
 Jack Oakie as Joe Spring
 Ned Sparks as Happy Winter
 Guy Buccola as Pete Summer
 Joseph Cawthorn as Keppel
 Ivan Lebedeff as Prince Nicholaus of Aregon
 Doris Eaton as Singer at Club Joyzelle
 Gus Arnheim and His Ambassadors

Unbilled
 André Cheron as Aide to Prince Nicholaus
 June Clyde as Blonde at McGregor's
 Russ Columbo as Violinist with Gus Arnheim and His Ambassadors
 Eddie Kane	as Mr. Gilman
 Wilfrid North as Man with Prince Nicholaus
 Rolfe Sedan as Patron at Little Aregon
 Ellinor Vanderveer	as Dowager at Little Aregon
 Florence Wix as Prince Nicolaus' Escort

Reception
The film opened at New York City's Globe Theatre (now named the Lunt-Fontanne Theatre) and earned over a million dollars for RKO. It made $806,000 domestically and $198,000 overseas, resulting in a profit of $800,000, almost half of RKO's total profit for the year of $1,670,000.

Songs
 "My Dream Memory" - Oscar Levant and Sidney Clare — Performed by Betty Compson on violin
 "Lovable and Sweet" - Oscar Levant and Sidney Clare — Performed by John Harron, Ned Sparks, Jack Oakie, and Guy Buccola
 "Broken Up Tune You're Doin' It" - Oscar Levant and Sidney Clare — Performed by Doris Eaton with Gus Arnheim band

Remakes
Due to its initial success, Street Girl was remade by RKO twice. The first film, That Girl From Paris (1936), starred Lily Pons and Lucille Ball. The second, Four Jacks and a Jill (1942), starred Ray Bolger, Anne Shirley, and Desi Arnaz. This was a rare coincidence in Hollywood where a husband and wife appeared in two different versions of the same film.

Notes
The March 1928 short story upon which the film is based originally appeared in Young's Magazine, and its title, "The Viennese Charmer", would indicate that Freddie's original homeland might have been Austria, but was fictionalized to Aregon for the film version.

References

External links
 
 
 
 

1920s romantic musical films
1920s musical comedy-drama films
1929 films
American black-and-white films
American romantic musical films
American musical comedy-drama films
American romantic comedy-drama films
Films based on short fiction
Films directed by Wesley Ruggles
Films set in New York City
RKO Pictures films
Films with screenplays by Jane Murfin
1920s romantic comedy-drama films
1920s American films
1920s English-language films